Shutterfly, LLC. is an American photography, photography products, and image sharing company, headquartered in Redwood City, California. The company is mainly known for custom photo printing services, including books featuring user-provided images, framed pictures, and other objects with custom image prints, including blankets or mobile phone cases.

Founded in 1999, the company is currently led by Hilary Schneider as the President and CEO, and owned by Apollo Global Management (majority) and District Photo (minority). The company went public in 2006, and returned to private ownership in 2019 after being acquired.

History
Shutterfly was founded in December 1999 by Eva Manolis and Dan Baum as an internet-based social expression and personal publishing service.
Its corporate headquarters are located in Redwood City, California. The company's flagship product is its photo book line.

In 2000, Shutterfly partnered with Kodak to offer their customers film developing and scanning services. In 2012, Shutterfly acquired Kodak Gallery from the Eastman Kodak Company for $23.8 million.

In 2001, Shutterfly secured $3 million in incremental capital which was used to expand its infrastructure. The funds include an equipment financing line from Silicon Valley bank. In 2002, the company exceeded its expected earnings and began considering an IPO for 2004 however, it did not take place until 2006. In September 2006, they completed their initial public offering and their common stock was officially listed on the NASDAQ Global Select Market under the symbol “SFLY."

In 2007 Shutterfly was recognized by Deloitte & Touche as Fast 50 Technology Company for Silicon Valley and a Fast 500 Company for North America. Shutterfly ranked #20 in the Internet, Media & Entertainment and Communication category on the Fast 50 list and ranked #241 on the Fast 500 list. The annual rankings identify technology, media, telecommunications and life sciences companies that have shown the fastest growth over the past year. Rankings are based on percentage of fiscal year revenue growth over five years, from 2002 to 2006. Shutterfly grew 671 percent during this period.

In 2009, Shutterfly began its acquisition plans with the purchase of Tiny Pictures, a mobile photo-sharing application centered on photo commenting. This is the first of several acquisitions the company made over the next few years. In 2011, Shutterfly acquired Tiny Prints, Inc. and Wedding Paper Divas. 
In 2012, the company acquired Penguin Digital, the makers of the MoPho app which they transitioned into the Shutterfly Mobile App. In 2013, the company acquired This Life, a cloud-based solution for organizing and sharing photos and videos. In 2013, Shutterfly acquired BorrowLenses, a rental company for high-end photography equipment. In 2014, Shutterfly acquired mobile app company Groovebook for $14.5 million which had secured a deal on Shark Tank eleven months prior.  In 2018, Shutterfly acquired Lifetouch for $825 million.

On June 10, 2019, Apollo Global Management announced that it would acquire Shutterfly for $2.7 billion, as well as its competitor Snapfish in a separate transaction valued at around $300 million. Apollo plans to merge both companies into a single entity, with Snapfish parent company District Photo as a minority stakeholder. On September 25, 2019, Apollo's acquisition of Shutterfly was completed, while the proposed merger of Shutterfly and Snapfish was still in process. The merger of Shutterfly and Snapfish was completed on January 8, 2020.

In June 2021, Shutterfly acquired the on-demand printing company Spoonflower.

In September 2021, Shutterfly settled a class-action lawsuit, relating to a breach of Illinois' Biometric Information Privacy Act, for $6.75 million USD.
 
In December 2021 Shutterfly was subject to a ransomware attack. The ransomware group 'Conti' subsequently published 7 gigabytes of Shutterfly data including employment agreements, financial documents, legal documents and payroll data.

Products and services
Shutterfly enables users to create personalized photo gifts (including photos and text) such as smartphone cases, photo books, wall art, and home décor. Through its Lifetouch division, it also provides portraiture services.  It competes with Snapfish and other online photo services. As of 2019, Shutterfly serves 10+ million customers with 26+ million orders per year, and hosts more than 50 billion photos on its photo storage platform.

Divisions
Tiny Prints and Wedding Paper Divas: In March 2011, Shutterfly acquired personalized card and stationery seller Tiny Prints, Inc. and partner-company Wedding Paper Divas for $141 million in cash and 3.9 million shares. The total transaction was valued at $333 million.
In September 2014, the company launched “Tiny Prints for iPad” in September 2014; a mobile version of their online stationery shop the company acquired in 2011.

This Life: In 2013, Shutterfly acquired ThisLife, for organizing and sharing photos and videos. ThisLife initially launched in 2010 by husband-and-wife team Matt and Andrea Johnson. ThisLife has raised a $2.75 million seed round led by Madrona Venture Group, with Madrona Managing Director Greg Gottesman joining its board. The company was acquired by Shutterfly in January 2013 and the purchase was reported to cost $25 million. ThisLife aggregates photos from social networks, mobile devices, personal computers, and cloud storage. The company transitioned This Life into the all-new Shutterfly Photos platform in 2016.

Treat: In April 2012, Shutterfly launched Treat, a service to create customized greeting cards. Unlike other divisions of Shutterfly that were acquired, Treat was developed internally. The site has 4,500 customizable card designs and has a partnership with Hallmark. In February 2015, Shutterfly announced it would shut down Treat.

BorrowLenses:  Mark Gurevich and Max Shevyakov launched BorrowLenses in 2007 as a way for individuals to rent high-level camera equipment. The company has two headquarters in San Carlos, California and Waltham, Massachusetts. In October 2013, Shutterfly acquired BorrowLenses. Terms of the deal weren't released.

Lifetouch: The world's largest school photography company was acquired in 2018 in an all-cash deal for $825 million.

Snapfish: A web-based photo sharing and photo printing service that was acquired on January 8, 2020.

See also 

 Web-to-print
 Print-on-demand

Self-printing publishers 

 Cafe Press
 CustomInk
 Displays2Go
 Redbubble
 Shopify
 Spreadshirt
 Teespring
 Vistaprint
 Zazzle

References 

1999 establishments in California
Online retailers of the United States
Companies based in Redwood City, California
American companies established in 1999
Internet properties established in 1999
Image-sharing websites
American photography websites
Self-publishing online stores
2006 initial public offerings
Companies formerly listed on the Nasdaq
2019 mergers and acquisitions
Apollo Global Management companies